Colette M. Jenkins was an American journalist. She was an award-winning religion/ethics writer at the Akron Beacon Journal.

While working for the Akron Beacon Journal in 1993, Jenkins was one of several reporters who worked on a project studying race relations in Northeastern Ohio. The series, entitled "A Question of Color," won the 1994 Pulitzer Prize for Public Service.

Mrs. Colette Marie Jenkins Parker, 60, left a legacy of love when she fell asleep in the arms of the Lord on Saturday, Nov. 28, 2020, following a short illness. Colette was a humble person who wanted you to know her heart more than her accolades. 
She started as a staff writer at the Warren Tribune. After starting her career in Warren, Ohio, she transitioned to religion/ethics writer at the Akron Beacon Journal for 25 years, from April 1992 to November 2016. 
Colette continued a journey of faith and was a current member of St. Elizabeth Ann Seton Church in Warren. She served as a Dominican Associate and was the current Director of Associates for the Dominican Sisters of Peace in Akron from December 2016 until her death. She was a 1989 graduate of Indiana University-Bloomington.
In addition to her parents, she was preceded in death by brothers, Henry Jr., Willie Charles and Carl Jenkins; and sister, Grace Broadway.

Colette was an amazing wife and mother. Left to cherish her loving memory are her husband, Darryl Parker; daughter, Angelica Parker, both of Ohio; sister, Valerie L. Jenkins; and brother, Tommy Floyd Jenkins of South Bend, Ind. [5]

References 

American women journalists
Year of birth missing (living people)
Living people
21st-century American women